Pseudochromis striatus, the striated dottyback, is a species of ray-finned fish from the Western Pacific, including the Philippines, Taiwan and Ryukyu Islands, which is a member of the family Pseudochromidae.

References

striatus
Taxa named by Anthony C. Gill
Taxa named by Shao Kwang-Tsao
Fish described in 1995